WSNN-LD, virtual channel 39 (UHF digital channel 26), is a low-powered television station licensed to Sarasota, Florida, United States. Owned by Citadel Communications and managed by LDB Media, LLC, the station's Suncoast News Network (SNN) service provides news coverage focusing primarily on the North Port-Bradenton-Sarasota Metropolitan Statistical Area (including Sarasota, Manatee, and Charlotte counties). SNN operates in conjunction with the Sarasota Herald-Tribune, and is headquartered in downtown Sarasota.
On cable, the station is carried on Comcast channel 6 (SD) and 400 (HD) in Sarasota and Charlotte Counties; Frontier FiOS on channel 9 (SD) and 509 (HD); and Spectrum channel 20 (SD) and 1020 (HD). WSNN's transmitter is located on Cedar Hammock Lane in Sarasota.

History
The SNN operation was launched on July 17, 1995, exclusively on Comcast. Over its history, it was branded as SNN Local News, SNN Local News 6, SNN News 6 and Six News Now, which were often used interchangeably. SNN received national attention in 2007, when a clip of chief meteorologist Justin Mosely (who worked with the channel from 2004 to 2013 and returned in March 2014) reacting frightened after a cockroach crawled up his leg during a live weather segment went viral after it was posted on various video websites including YouTube.

In November 2008, the Sarasota Herald-Tribune (then owned by The New York Times Company) announced that it would sell SNN News 6, and stop broadcasting at the end of December 2008. This deadline was extended after the company struck agreements with a group of investors, led by SNN general manager Linda DesMaris and her husband Doug Barker, to purchase the channel; however on January 25, 2009, one of the investors dropped out of the deal. On January 29, 2009, the Herald-Tribune announced that SNN News 6 would go dark, effective at midnight on January 29, 2009. The company would later find another investor in Phil Lombardo, CEO of the television station group Citadel Communications in Bronxville, New York. On February 26, 2009, after a four-week hiatus, SNN was back on the air under the management of LDB Media, LLC, with the majority of its former on-air staff. Since its inception, the channel was exclusively carried on Comcast's systems in Sarasota and Charlotte Counties. In the summer of 2012, SNN struck a carriage deal with Verizon FiOS to add the channel; FiOS began carrying SNN in the Sarasota area at 2:00 a.m. Eastern Time on September 13, 2012. Over time other cable networks were added, to expand coverage around the Sarasota/Manatee area.

In January 2014, Lombardo and Citadel Communications acquired a majority interest in the company. As a result, Citadel took over broadcast operations of SNN. During February 2014, the SNN studio facilities underwent a major remodeling. One month earlier on February 12, SNN debuted a new graphics package. weather graphics were rolled out on February 22. On March 2, the channel debuted a new logo (an "SNN" wordmark with a blue wave underneath) and rebranded as SNN - Suncoast News Network. The following day on March 3 at 5:00 p.m. Eastern, SNN unveiled a new main news set and weather center (the latter of which incorporates the logo previously used under the "SNN Local News 6" brand). The station's image resembles those of Citadel stations WLNE-TV in Providence, Rhode Island and KLKN in Lincoln, Nebraska, who have become sister stations to SNN. It was also the only non-ABC affiliated television station owned by Citadel; in 2019, Citadel sold WLNE and KLKN to Standard Media, with WSNN being the remaining station under Citadel ownership.

On September 24, 2014, Citadel announced that SNN's operations would be merged with its over-the-air television station in Sarasota, WLWN-LD (channel 39), on October 15; as part of the consolidation, WLWN changed its call letters to WSNN-LD. The combined station retains SNN's existing programming and cable carriage. On April 15, WSNN launched two subchannels from Katz Broadcasting: Grit and Laff.

On May 16, 2019, it was announced that Standard Media, led by former Young Broadcasting and Media General executive Deb McDermott, would acquire Citadel's WLNE and KLKN for $83 million. The sale was completed on September 5.

SNN was the first television news operation to convert to an all digital-disk-based non-linear editing system through Avid. SNN was one of the first news operations to have a combined print and broadcast newsroom, collaborating with the Sarasota Herald-Tribune on news content. Since 2002, SNN has maintained a content-sharing agreement with Tampa-based NBC affiliate WFLA-TV (channel 8) and NBC News, which allows SNN to use stories from WFLA, NBC News and NBC-affiliated stations (that agreement replaced an earlier deal between the channel, Fox owned-and-operated station WTVT (channel 13), and the now-defunct CONUS Communications), and also allowed for cooperation between the Herald-Tribune and the Tampa Tribune, prior to Media General's sale of that paper to World Media Holdings in 2012.

SNN is partnered with the Sarasota Herald-Tribune and WFLA-TV. National stories come from NBC News and CNN. SNN also operates one weather and traffic camera since April 2014, the camera was installed atop of One Sarasota Tower, under a brand licensing deal with various local companies over the years. SNN began multiplex programming on February 2, 2015. On June 15, 2015, Verizon FiOS changed channels of SNN from 26/526 to channel 9/509. In 2016, SNN upgraded graphics and slightly updated logo. Later that year, the Herald Tribune moved out of their former space and made their way next door into the old SunTrust building. It is unclear if SNN will be moving to the new facility as in 2018, Sarasota Memorial Hospital announced it would buy out the old Herald Tribune building and re-construct the entire area. In 2018, SNN re-vamped their website, now offering live-streams of their Skycam, newscasts as they happen, job offerings, calendars and event planning.

Digital television

Digital channels
The station's digital signal is multiplexed:

Programming
SNN features live newscasts for 7½ hours on weekdays and 2 hours on weekends, barring any breaking news that could extend its time, as well as live weather segments during the morning and evening hours, with more frequent updates during severe weather events. The station occasionally broadcasts parades in the area, including boat shows and firework shows near Christmas and New Years.

In addition to regular rolling news programming, SNN also shows airs two local talk shows:

 Suncoast FYI, hosted by Nancy O'Neil, is focused on speaking with non-profit and volunteer leaders around the Sarasota Area about events and programs
 Suncoast POV, hosted by Craig Burdick, is focused on speaking with civil, political, and business leaders about current events

SNN also airs a collection of syndicated programs, including:
 Business First
 Law & Crime
 Access Daily
 Daily Mail
 Dateline
 Celebrity Page
 Small Town, Big Deal
 Matter of Fact with Soledad O'Brien
 Raceweek

Personalities
 Kathy Leon (2003–present) Morning Edition anchor
 Jenna Brew (2020–present) Morning Edition anchor
 Don Brennan (2017–present) Evening Edition anchor
 Cynthia McLaughlin (2021–present) Evening Edition anchor
 Emma Sears (2021-present) Weekend Edition anchor
 John Reynolds (2021–present) Sports Director
 Justin Mosely (2004–2013, 2014-present) Chief Meteorologist
 Marco La Manno (2016–present) Morning Meteorologist
 Leslie London (2021–present) Weekend Meteorologist
 Samantha Sonner (2017–present) Reporter
 Annette Gutierrez (2019–present) Reporter
 Valezka Nava (2020–present) Reporter

See also
 Bay News 9 – a similar 24-hour regional cable news channel for the Tampa Bay Area operated by Spectrum
 News 13 – a similar 24-hour regional cable news channel for the Orlando area operated by Spectrum

References

External links
 Official website
 SNN Facebook page
 SNN Twitter page
 SNN YouTube page

Sarasota, Florida
24-hour television news channels in the United States
Grit (TV network) affiliates
Laff (TV network) affiliates
English-language television stations in the United States
Independent television stations in the United States
Television channels and stations established in 2012
Low-power television stations in the United States
SNN-LD
2012 establishments in Florida